Courtney is a name of Old French origin, introduced into England after the Norman Conquest of 1066. It has two quite distinct interpretations: firstly, the surname may be locational, from places called Courtenay in the regions of Loiret and Gâtinais. The House of Courtenay was a significant French family with close association with both the French and English royal lines; in England the Courtenays were Earls of Devon.

Secondly, in some cases, bearers of the surname may be of Irish descent, since Courtney is also an Anglicized form of the Gaelic "O'Curnain", descendant of Curnan, from an Old Irish personal name of obscure origins. Recordings of the name from London Church Registers include: the christening of Thomas Courtney at All Hallows, London Wall, on 11 November 1569, and the marriage of William Courtney and Mary Lucas on 22 March 1590, at St Dunstan's, Stepney. John Courtney and his wife, Sybill, were early immigrants to America, leaving London on the Paule in July 1635, bound for Virginia. An early coat of arms granted to the family depicts a blue fesse between three torteaux on a gold shield. The first recorded spelling of the family name is shown to be that of Reginald de Curtenay, which was dated 1164, in "Feudal Documents from the Abbey of Bury St Edmunds", Suffolk, during the reign of King Henry II.

People with the surname
 Brendan Courtney (born 1971), Irish television presenter
 Charles E. Courtney (1849–1920), American rower and rowing coach
 C. F. Courtney (died 1941), manager of Australian mining and ore treatment company
 Christopher Courtney (1890–1976), British Royal Air Force officer
 Clint Courtney (1927–1975), American baseball player
 Dave Courtney (born 1959), British author and self-proclaimed ex-gangster
 Duane Courtney (born 1985), English footballer
 Eamon Courtenay (born 1960), Belizean politician
 Ernie Courtney (1875–1920), American baseball player
 Henry A. Courtney Jr. (1916–1945), US Marine Corps Reserve officer during World War II and Medal of Honor recipient
 Jack Courtney (disambiguation), multiple people
 Jacqueline Courtney (born 1946), American actor
 Jai Courtney (born 1986), Australian actor
 James Courtney (born 1980), Australian racing driver
 Janet E. Courtney (1865–1954), British scholar, writer and feminist
 Joe Courtney (politician) (born 1953), American lawyer and Democratic politician
 Joel Courtney (born 1996), American film actor
 John Courtney (disambiguation), multiple people
 Jon Courtney (1918–1997), British musician
 Leonard Courtney, 1st Baron Courtney of Penwith (1832–1918), British politician and man of letters
 Lou Courtney (born 1943), American musician
 Mel Courtney, New Zealand Independent politician; great-nephew of James Courtney of New Zealand
 Nicholas Courtney (1929–2011), British television actor
 Pip Courtney, Australian journalist and television presenter
 Robert Courtney (born 1952), American pharmacist convicted of fraud
 Roger Courtney, British military officer influential in the establishment of the Special Boat Service
 Stephanie Courtney (born 1970), American actor and comedian
 Steven Courtney (born 1955), British scientist
 Tom Courtney (born 1933), former American athlete
 Vernon Harrison Courtenay (1932–2009), Belizean politician
 William Harrison Courtney (born 1944), American diplomat
 William Leonard Courtney (1850–1928), English author

People with the given name
Courtney was used as a given name for men beginning at least as far back as the 17th century (e.g. the British Member of Parliament Sir Courtney Pool, 1677). As a given name for women, however, it gained wide acceptance only in the years following the 1956 publication of Pamela Moore's novel "Chocolates for Breakfast", whose protagonist Courtney Farrell sometimes wishes she had been born a man.

Female
Courtney Abbot (born 1989), New Zealand actress
Courtney Act (born 1982), Australian drag queen
Courtney Adeleye, American founder
Courtney Marie Andrews (born 1990), American singer-songwriter
Courtney Babcock (born 1972), Canadian runner
Courtney Banghart (born 1978), American basketball coach
Courtney Barnett (born 1987), Australian singer-songwriter and guitarist
Courtney Blades (born 1978), American softball player
Courtney Bowman (born 1995), English actress
Courtney Angela Brkic (born 1972), American memoirist
Courtney Brosnan (born 1995), American-Irish footballer
Courtney Bruce (born 1993), Australian netball player
Courtney Bryan (composer), American composer
Courtney Burke (born 1994), American ice hockey defenseman
Cortney Casey (born 1987), American mixed martial artist
Courtney Clarkson (born 1991), Australian rules footballer
Courtney Clements (born 1989), American basketball player
Courteney Cox (born 1964), American actress, best known for playing a character in Friends
Courtney Cox Cole (1971-2019), American athlete
Courtney Coleman (born 1981), American basketball player
Courtney Conlogue (born 1992), American surfer
Courtney Cox (musician) (born 1989), American guitarist
Courtney Cramey (born 1985), Australian rules footballer
Courtney Rachel Culkin (born 1983), American model
Courtney Dauwalter (born 1985), American runner
Courtney Deifel (born 1980), American softball coach
Courtney Dike (born 1995), Nigerian footballer
Courtney Duever (born 1991), American basketball player
Courtney Duncan (motorcyclist) (born 1996), New Zealand motorcycle racer
Courtney Eaton (born 1996), Australian model
Courtney Ekmark (born 1995), American basketball player
Courtney Simmons Elwood (born 1968), American attorney
Courtney Enders (born 1986), American auto racer
Courtney Field (born 1997), Australian track cyclist
Courtney Fink, American art curator
Courtney Force (born 1988), American auto racer
Courtney Ford (born 1978), American actress
Courtney Fortune, American singer-songwriter
Courtney Frerichs (born 1993), American middle-distance runner
Courtney Friel (born 1980), American television presenter
Courtney Garrett (born 1992), American beauty pageant titleholder
Courtney George (born 1986), American curler
Courtney Gibbs (born 1966), American actress
Courtney Guard (born 1991), Australian rules footballer
Courtney Gum (born 1981), Australian rules footballer
Courtney Hadwin (born 2004), English singer-songwriter
Courtney Hansen (born 1974), American television host
Courtney Halverson (born 1989), American actress
Courtney Hazlett (born 1976), American columnist
Courtney Henggeler (born 1978), American actress
Courtney Hicks (born 1995), American figure skater
Courtney Hill (born 1987), Australian cricket player
Courtney Houssos, Australian politician
Courtney Rae Hudson (born 1973), American justice
Courtney Hunt (born 1964), American director
Courtney Hurley (born 1990), American fencer
Courtney Jaye (born 1978), American singer-songwriter
Courtney Jenaé, Los Angeles-based singer-songwriter
Courtney Jines (born 1992), American actress
Courtney Johnson (water polo) (born 1974), American water polo player
Courtney Johnston, New Zealand chief executive
Courtney Jolly (born 1986), American race car driver
Courtney Dunbar Jones, American judge
Courtney Jones (soccer) (born 1990), American soccer player
Cortney Jordan (born 1991), American swimmer
Kourtney Kardashian (born 1979), American media personality
Kourtney Keegan (born 1994), American tennis player
Courtney A. Kemp (born 1977), American television writer
Courtney Jane Kendrick (born 1977), American blogger
Courtney Kennedy (born 1979), American ice hockey player
Courtney Kessel (born 1989), Canadian ice hockey player
Courtney King-Dye (born 1977), American equestrian
Kourtney Klein, American vocalist
Courtney Knight, Canadian Paralympics athlete
Courtney Kupets (born 1986), American gymnast
Kourtney Kunichika (born 1991), American ice hockey forward
Cortney Lollar, English professor
Courtney Love (born 1964), American rock musician and actress
Courteney Lowe (born 1991), New Zealand professional racing cyclist
Courtney MacIntosh (born 1983), Canadian rower
Cortney Mansour (born 1994), Canadian-Czech ice dancer
Courtney Marsh (born 1986), American film director
Courtney E. Martin (born 1979), American author
Courtney Mathewson (born 1986), American water polo player
Courtney McCool (born 1988), American gymnast
Courtney McGregor (born 1998), New Zealand gymnast
Courtney Meldrum (born 1977), American long-distance runner
Courtney Sina Meredith (born 1986), New Zealand poet
Courtney Milan (born 1976), American author
Courtney A. Miller, American neuroscientist
Courtney Allison Moulton (born 1986), American author
Courteney Munn (born 1998), Australian rules footballer
Courtney Boyd Myers (born 1984), American journalist
Courtney Nagle (born 1982), American professional tennis player
Courtney Neron, American politician
Courtney Niemiec (born 1992), American soccer player
Courtney Okolo (born 1994), American athletics competitor
Kortney Olson (born 1981), American-born bodybuilder and athlete
Cortney Palm (born 1987), American actress
Courtney Paris (born 1987), American basketball player
Courtney Parker (born 1985), American singer living in Greece
Courtney Peldon (born 1981), American television and film actress
Courtney C. Radsch (born 1979), American journalist
Courtney Raetzman (born 1994), American soccer player
Courtney Reed (born 1985), American actress
Courtney Rush (born 1983), Canadian professional wrestler
Courtney Ryan (born 1990), American basketball player
Courtney Sarault (born 2000), Canadian short track speed skater
Courtney Schulhoff (born 1987), American prisoner
Courtney Shealy (born 1977), American swimmer
Courtney Sheinmel (born 1977), American author
Courtney Simon (born 1946), American writer
Courtney Sixx (born 1985), American model
Courtney Stodden (born 1994), American television personality
Courtney Summers (born 1986), Canadian writer
Courtney Sweetman-Kirk (born 1990), English footballer
Courtney Tairi (born 1988), New Zealand netball player
Courtney Thomas (born 1988), American beauty pageant titleholder
Courtney Thompson (born 1984), American volleyball player
Courtney Thorne-Smith (born 1967), American actress
Courtney Thorpe (born 1990), Australian beauty pageant titleholder
Cortney Tidwell (born 1972), American singer-songwriter
Courtney Turner (born 1994), American ice hockey player
Courtney Vandersloot (born 1989), American basketball player
Courtney Verloo (born 1991), American soccer player
Cortnee Vine (born 1998), Australian soccer player
Courtney Wakefield (born 1987), Australian rules footballer
Courtney Watson (politician) (born 1962), Democratic politician
Courtney Webb (sportswoman) (born 1999), Australian rules footballer
Courtney Wetzel (born 1989), American soccer player
Courtney Williams (basketball) (born 1994), American basketball player
Courtney Winsloe (born 1987), New Zealand cricketer
Kortney Wilson (born c. 1979), Canadian country music singer
Courtney Young (librarian), American librarian
Courtney Yamada-Anderson (born 1980), American skeleton racer
Courtney Zablocki (born 1981), American luger

Male
Courtney Alexander (born 1977), American basketball player
Courtney Anderson (born 1980), American football player
Courtney B. Vance (born 1960), American actor
Sir Courtney Blackman, Barbadian economist, business consultant and diplomat
Cortney Lance Bledsoe (born 1976), American writer
Edward Courtney Boyle (1883–1967), English recipient of the Victoria Cross
Courtney Brown, American social scientist and proponent of remote viewing
Courtney Brown (born 1978), American football player
Kourtney Brown (born 1988), American football outside linebacker
Courtney Browne (born 1970), West Indian cricketer
Kortney Clemons (born 1980), American athlete
Charles Courtney Curran (1861–1942), American Impressionist painter
William Courtney Dowling (born 1944), American author and social critic
Courtney Gains (born 1965), American actor
Courtenay Gonsalves (1950–2013), Guyanese cricketer
Lawrence Courtney Haines (known as Courtney) (c.1920-1996), Australian ornithologist
Courtney Hall (1968-2021), American football player
Kortney Hause (born 1995), English footballer
Courtney Hodges (1887–1966), United States Army general
Courtney Lawes (born 1989), English rugby union player
Courtney Lee (born 1985), American basketball player
 Courtney Lewis (born 1984), British conductor
Courtney Murphy (born 1979), contestant in the 2004 season of the Australian reality television series Australian Idol
John Courtney Murray (1904–1967), Jesuit theologian
Courtney Pine (born 1964), British jazz musician
Courtney Pitt (born 1981), English footballer
Courtney Roby (born 1983), American football player
Courtney Senior (born 1997), English footballer
Courtney Solomon (born 1971), Canadian film director
Courtney Taylor-Taylor (born 1967), American songwriter, singer and guitarist
Courtney Walsh (born 1962), West Indian cricketer
Courtney Watson (born 1980), American football player
Courtney Whitney (1897–1969), American lawyer and Army commander
Kortney Ryan Ziegler (born 1980), American filmmaker

Fictional characters
 Courtney Chetwynde, from D.J. MacHale's Pendragon series
 Courtney Crimsen, a character in the novel and Netflix TV series 13 Reasons Why
 Courtney Crumrin, character in a comic book series written and illustrated by Ted Naifeh and released through Oni Press
 Courtney Farrell, protagonist of the 1956 best-seller Chocolates for Breakfast by Pamela Moore
 Courtney Gripling, character in the Nickelodeon animated series As Told By Ginger
 Courtney Haine, aka Sergeant Hatred, a character in the adult animated series The Venture Bros.
 Courtney Heironimus, mobile suit pilot from the Gundam franchise
 Courtney Krieger, aka Cover Girl, a character in the G.I. Joe franchise
 Courtney Matthews, heroine on the ABC soap opera General Hospital
 Courtney Mitchell, a character in the British soap opera EastEnders
 Courtney Ross, aka Saturnyne, a character from Marvel Comics
 Courtney Whitmore, aka Stargirl, from DC Comics
 Courtney Lane, a character from the 2009 musical television film Spectacular!
 Courtney, a character from the Canadian animated series Total Drama 
 Courtney, a character in the series The Fairly OddParents: Fairly Odder
 Courtney Shayne, antagonist in the film Jawbreaker

See also
Courtney (disambiguation)
The House of Courtenay (a family)
 The Earldom of Devon

References

English masculine given names
English feminine given names
English unisex given names
English-language unisex given names
English-language masculine given names
English-language feminine given names
Feminine given names
Masculine given names
Unisex given names